For the Love of Egypt (FLE) is a political alliance created by the General Intelligence Service. FLE contested the 2015 Egyptian parliamentary election.

Creation
The For the Love of Egypt (FLE) alliance was created with a founding meeting on 3 February 2015, chaired by General Ehab Saad of the General Intelligence Service (Mukhabarat) at the Mukhabarat headquarters. Participants were invited to the meeting by Major Ahmed Shaaban, a Military Intelligence officer close to president Abdel Fattah el-Sisi, who played a major role in organising pro-Sisi political coalitions. The main coordinator for choosing who should be a member of the list was Yaser Selim, a former Mukhabarat officer still working for the Mukhabarat as a civilian, with Seif al-Yazal having a nominal responsibility in coordinating the list. The creation of the alliance was announced in a press conference on 4 February 2015.

2015 election
In the 2015 Egyptian parliamentary election, the party submitted an electoral list contesting the 45 closed-list seats of the Upper Egypt constituency. Initially, the list however was rejected by Egypt's High Election Committee (HEC). In the final announcement, the list however was eventually admitted. In the other three constituencies, the party didn't submit an electoral list.

Some of the individuals involved with the alliance, including Tamarod founder Mahmoud Badr as well as former minister Osama Heikal, were formerly part of Kamal el-Ganzouri's National Alliance. The Tagammu Party left the alliance and will compete for individual seats as part of the Leftist Alliance. A member of the party attempted to join the For the Love of Egypt list, though he was not allowed to. The Tomorrow Party left the alliance and rejoined the Egyptian Front. The Egyptian Patriotic Movement and My Homeland Egypt Party are not part of the alliance. The coalition is seen as being supportive of current president Abdel Fattah el-Sisi, although the Reform and Development Misruna Party has been skeptical about the support. 24 former members of the National Democratic Party won seats in the first phase of the 2015 election. The Reform and Development Misruna Party later became part of the Civil Democratic Movement.

Composition

References

2015 establishments in Egypt
2010s disestablishments in Egypt
Political party alliances in Egypt
Politics of Egypt
Right-wing parties